Kim Ho (born 24 November 1944) is a South Korean former football player and manager.

Early life 
Kim was born in Tongyeong, a coastal city of South Korea, and started football in his hometown. He originally joined Tongyeong High School when he became old enough to join a high school, but there was no football club. He transferred to Jinju High School the next year to learn football professionally. However, he experienced a slump in Jinju, and once again moved to another school, Dongnae High School in Busan. Kim respected the Dongnae's manager An Jong-soo, and followed him into a semi-professional club Cheil Industries instead of university.

International career 
Kim was on the South Korea national team from 1966 to 1972, and won the 1970 Asian Games. He originally played as a right back, but he showed his best performance as a centre-back. He was noted for his rapid pace and wild defense, and showed a great harmony with Kim Jung-nam, his partner centre-back.

Managerial career

Early career 
Kim took his first steps into coaching with his team Commercial Bank. He started to perform the managerial role in his alma mater Dongnae High School before taking over as coach of a semi-professional club Hanil Bank in 1983. Under Kim, Hanil Bank won the Korean Semi-professional League straight away, qualifying for the professional league, K League.

However, Hanil Bank turned its status into a semipro club again in 1987, and Kim left for a K League club Hyundai Horang-i the next year. He rejuvenated Hyundai in his first season by leading them to a second place finish, but couldn't sustain the result after that. Hyundai slipped down to the bottom in 1989, and remained second from bottom in 1990. He finally left Hyundai prior to the 1991 season.

South Korea 
Kim was back in management when he took over the rein of the South Korean national team in July 1992, and led it to the 1994 FIFA World Cup in the United States. His team put up some credible performances, drawing its opener 2–2 with Spain. However, South Korea drew its second game without a goal against Bolivia, facing the danger of being eliminated in the group stage. In the last group game against Germany, South Korea closed the gap to 3–2 after being 3–0 down at half-time. Kim and Koreans showed their effort against the World Cup holders, but it was inadequate to advance to the next round.

Suwon Samsung Bluewings 
After stepping down as national manager, Kim was contacted by a new K League club Suwon Samsung Bluewings to become the first-ever manager of the club. He lifted 13 trophies including two K Leagues and two Asian Club Championships for eight years with Suwon. He also nurtured and discovered young talents called the "Kim Ho's Children". Many of them had successful careers in the K League even after his resignation. Ko Jong-soo and Kim Do-heon played for the national team among his pupils. He announced his retirement at the end of 2003.

Daejeon Citizen 
Kim joined Daejeon Citizen in 2007, canceling his retirement. He had been regarded as one of the greatest South Korean managers before his return, but lost his honor by courting controversies in Daejeon. Kim was in conflict with the president and the board of directors due to team's financial problem as well as his poor results. Furthermore, the club's agent who was having a close relationship with Kim suffered discredit for embezzlement. Kim was finally removed from the team with the president in 2009.

Kim had finished his managerial career, but caused controversies again in Daejeon after 10 years. He was appointed the president of Daejeon Citizen in 2017 despite previous conflict, and engaged a significant number of his acquaintances as manager, agent, and players without principle. Daejeon Citizen was owned by the Daejeon Government at the time, and its finance was relying on the citizens' precious tax money. Kim received many criticisms, leaving Daejeon in 2019. Ko Jong-soo, the club's manager of the time and Kim's disciple, faced a court the next year.

Career statistics

International

Honours

Player 
Cheil Industries
Korean Semi-professional League (Spring): 1964
Korean Semi-professional League (Autumn): 1968
Korean President's Cup runner-up: 1968

Commercial Bank of Korea
Korean President's Cup: 1970

South Korea
Asian Games: 1970
AFC Asian Cup runner-up: 1972

Individual
Korean FA Player of the Year: 1969
Korean FA Best XI: 1969, 1970, 1971, 1972
KASA Best Korean Footballer: 1971

Manager 
Hanil Bank
Korean Semi-professional League: 1983
Korean Semi-professional League (Spring): 1987

Suwon Samsung Bluewings
 K League 1: 1998, 1999
 Korean FA Cup: 2002
 Korean League Cup: 1999, 1999+, 2000, 2001
 Korean Super Cup: 1999, 2000
 Asian Club Championship: 2000–01, 2001–02
 Asian Super Cup: 2001, 2002

Individual
Korean Semi-professional League (Spring) Best Manager: 1987
AFC Coach of the Month: August 1997
K League 1 Manager of the Year: 1998, 1999

References

External links

1944 births
Living people
South Korean footballers
South Korea international footballers
1972 AFC Asian Cup players
South Korean football managers
Sportspeople from South Gyeongsang Province
1994 FIFA World Cup managers
South Korea national football team managers
South Korea national football B team managers
Ulsan Hyundai FC managers
Suwon Samsung Bluewings managers
Daejeon Hana Citizen FC managers
Asian Games medalists in football
Footballers at the 1970 Asian Games
Asian Games gold medalists for South Korea
Association football defenders
Medalists at the 1970 Asian Games
Republic of Korea Marine Corps personnel